Vera Beatriz Protzen (10 February 1975 – 2 November 2020) was a German-born Argentinian Dressage rider. She competed twice at the Pan American Games; at the 2007 Pan American Games in Rio de Janeiro, where she came 5th in the finals, and at the 2019 Pan American Games in Lima where she came individual 7th in the finals. Vera won team and individual gold during the 2006 South American Games in Buenos Aires and team silver at the 2014 South American Games in Quillota, Chile.

On 2 November 2020 Vera got involved in a riding accident on her six year old horse and was discovered in the field at her stable. She was found with a serious brain trauma and was hospitalised to the Capilla del Señor Hospital in Buenos Aires, where she died.

References 

1976 births
2020 deaths
Female equestrians
Argentine dressage riders
Argentine people of German descent
Equestrians at the 2007 Pan American Games
Equestrians at the 2019 Pan American Games
Pan American Games competitors for Argentina
South American Games medalists in equestrian
South American Games silver medalists for Argentina
South American Games gold medalists for Argentina
Competitors at the 2006 South American Games
Competitors at the 2014 South American Games